Ivano Brugnetti (born 1 September 1976 in Milan) is an Italian former race walker.

Biography
Brugnetti won five medals, at individual level, in international athletics competitions. He participated at three editions of the Summer Olympics (2000, 2004, and 2008) and earned 22 caps in the national team from 1997 to 2008.

Achievements

National titles
Brugnetti is a seven-time winner at the Italian Athletics Championships.
4 wins in the 10,000 m walk (1999, 2006, 2008, 2009)
2 wins in the 20 km walk (2003, 2004)
1 win in the 5000 metres walk indoor (2001)

See also
 FIDAL Hall of Fame
 Italy at the European Race Walking Cup - Multiple medalists
 Italian all-time lists - 20 km walk
 Italian all-time lists - 50 km walk

References

External links
 
 

1976 births
Living people
Athletes from Milan
Italian male racewalkers
Olympic athletes of Italy
Olympic gold medalists for Italy
Athletes (track and field) at the 2000 Summer Olympics
Athletes (track and field) at the 2004 Summer Olympics
Athletes (track and field) at the 2008 Summer Olympics
Medalists at the 2004 Summer Olympics
World Athletics Championships athletes for Italy
World Athletics Championships medalists
Athletics competitors of Fiamme Gialle
Olympic gold medalists in athletics (track and field)
Mediterranean Games gold medalists for Italy
Mediterranean Games medalists in athletics
Athletes (track and field) at the 2001 Mediterranean Games
Athletes (track and field) at the 2009 Mediterranean Games
World Athletics Championships winners
21st-century Italian people